Logos Film Co., Ltd. is a Korean drama production company, which operates as a subsidiary of Kakao Entertainment. It was established on November 29, 2000, by Lee Jang-soo.

List of works

TV series

Theater plays

Managed people

Actors
  (a/k/a Mark Yuu)
 Kim Tae-hoon

Writers

Directors

References

External links
  
 

Mass media companies established in 2000
Television production companies of South Korea
Companies based in Seoul
South Korean companies established in 2000
Kakao subsidiaries
Kakao M